John Maxwell may refer to:

Arts and entertainment
John Maxwell (publisher) (1824–1895), British publisher
John Maxwell (producer) (1879–1940), British film producer
John Alan Maxwell (1904–1984), American artist and illustrator
John Maxwell (British artist) (1905–1962), Scottish artist
John Maxwell (actor) (1918–1982), American actor
John Maxwell (writer) (born 1944), American writer
John C. Maxwell (born 1947), American author and leadership coach

Politics 
John Maxwell, Lord Pollok (1648–1732), Scottish politician and lawyer
John Maxwell, 1st Baron Farnham (1687–1759), Irish peer and politician
John Robert Maxwell, Irish politician and Royal Governor of the Bahama Islands, 1783–1784
John Maxwell, 2nd Earl of Farnham (1760–1823), Irish representative peer and politician, grandson of the 1st Baron Farnham
Sir John Maxwell, 7th Baronet (1768–1844), British Member of Parliament for Paisley
Sir John Maxwell, 8th Baronet (1791–1865), British Member of Parliament for Lanarkshire and Renfrewshire, son of the above
John Waring Maxwell, Member of Parliament for Downpatrick, 1820–1830, 1832–1835
John Patterson Bryan Maxwell (1804–1845), U.S. Representative from New Jersey

Military
John Maxwell (Confederate agent), secret agent during the American Civil War
John Maxwell (Medal of Honor) (1841–1931), American Medal of Honor recipient
Sir John Maxwell (British Army officer) (1859–1929), British Army general and colonial governor

Nobility
John Maxwell, 3rd Lord Maxwell (died 1484), Scottish nobleman
John Maxwell, 4th Lord Maxwell (died 1513), Scottish nobleman, son of the above
John Maxwell, 8th Lord Maxwell (1553–1593), Scottish Catholic nobleman, great-grandson of the above
John Maxwell, 9th Lord Maxwell (c. 1583–1613), Scottish Catholic nobleman, son of the above

Sports 
John Maxwell (golfer) (1871–1906), American golfer and Olympic silver medalist
J. Rogers Maxwell (John Rogers Maxwell, Jr., 1875–1932), American yachtsman, son of John Rogers Maxwell, Sr.
John Maxwell (American football) (fl. 1902–1903), American football player for John Heisman's Clemson Tigers
John Maxwell (sport shooter) (born 1951), Australian Olympic sport shooter

Other
John Maxwell (bishop) (died 1647), Scottish prelate, Archbishop of Tuam, Bishop of Ross
John Maxwell (archdeacon of Clogher), Archdeacon of Clogher, 1762–1783
John Hall Maxwell (1812–1866), Scottish agriculturist
John Rogers Maxwell Sr. (1846–1910), American railroad executive and yachtsman
John Preston Maxwell (1871–1961), Presbyterian obstetric missionary to China
Sir John Maxwell (police officer) (1882–1968), Chief Constable of Manchester, 1927–1942
Johnny Maxwell, fictional character in Terry Pratchett's novels

See also
 Maxwell (surname)